Soyuz MS-06 was a Soyuz spaceflight which launched on 13 September 2017. It transported three members of the Expedition 53 crew to the International Space Station. Soyuz MS-06 was the 135th flight of a Soyuz spacecraft. The crew consisted of a Russian commander, and two American flight engineers. It returned to Earth on 28 February 2018 after 168 days in orbit.

Crew

Backup crew 

Due to a decision to cut down the number of participating Russian astronauts in 2017, changes were made in crew assignments to the ISS. Originally set to be on Soyuz MS-04, Alexander Misurkin and Mark T. Vande Hei have been assigned to Soyuz MS-06 instead.

References 

Crewed Soyuz missions
Spacecraft launched in 2017
2017 in Russia
Spacecraft launched by Soyuz-FG rockets
Spacecraft which reentered in 2018
Fully civilian crewed orbital spaceflights